The men's 50 metre freestyle competition of the swimming events at the 2011 World Aquatics Championships was held on July 29 with the heats and the semifinals and July 30 with the final.

Records
Prior to the competition, the existing world and championship records were as follows.

Results

Heats
117 swimmers participated in 16 heats.

Semifinals
The semifinals were held at 18:35.

Semifinal 1

Semifinal 2

Swimoff

Final
The final was held at 18:09.

References

External links
2011 World Aquatics Championships: Men's 50 metre freestyle start list, from OmegaTiming.com; retrieved 2011-07-23.

Freestyle 0050 metre, men's
World Aquatics Championships